Goodachari is a 2018 Indian Telugu-language action spy thriller film directed by Sashi Kiran Tikka. The film stars Adivi Sesh, Sobhita Dhulipala, and Jagapathi Babu with Prakash Raj, Supriya Yarlagadda, Vennela Kishore, Anish Kuruvilla, Rakesh Varre and Madhu Shalini in supporting roles. The film features music composed by Sricharan Pakala, cinematography by Shaneil Deo and editing by Garry BH.

The film was released on 3 August 2018. Sesh, Tikka and Rahul Pakala won the Best Screenplay at Zee Cine Awards Telugu. The film is considered one of the "25 Greatest Telugu Films Of The Decade" by Film Companion. The sequel, G2, is under development.

Plot 
Gopi's father Raghuveer is killed during a classified mission as a RAW field operative. His uncle Sathya, who is also a RAW agent fakes his and Gopi's death and raises Gopi as Arjun Kumar, who dreams of joining RAW and serving the country but gets no response even after sending 174 applications. In the 175th application, Arjun mentions his father's name and gets recruited by the RAW's secret weapon Trinetra. At first, Sathya doesn't accept Arjun's decision for fear of losing him, but Arjun tells about his passion for serving the nation like Raghuveer and Sathya relents. Later, Trinetra's chief Damodar, briefs his recruits about Al-Mujahideen, a terrorist outfit based in several countries, and its leader called Rana, whose identity remains unknown despite several attempts. Meanwhile, Arjun starts dating Dr. Sameera Rao, an M.A. psychology graduate from Harvard University, and the girl-next-door. Sameera introduces her uncle as her father during one of their meetings and confesses that her parents died in an accident, and she now considers her uncle as her father. Seeing how he is in a similar situation, Arjun reveals his true identity as Gopi to Sameera. 

Meanwhile, it is revealed that Al-Mujahideen knows all about Trinetra. They implemented an operation Mission Gopi. Arjun notices an Al-Mujahideen member, Hamza, near the Trinetra office and follows him. After some chase and struggle, he obtains a clue 1112 from the agent. Trinetra assumes that it is an attack plan on 11 December, but can't find the target of this attack, so they keep a close watch. During graduation, Acharya, a senior official and founder of Trinetra attends as a chief guest of the ceremony. Sameera suggests that Arjun presents a Jameson Irish Whiskey bottle to Damodar. At graduation, all recruits get their postings: Mohammad Basha is selected for primary security detail, including escorting Acharya. Leena Raajan is assigned to the reconnaissance team in Dhaka through the Indian embassy. Arjun gets selected as a top spy as he achieved the training without any weakness. He is presented with a Trinetra agency number 116 as a covert operative, his primary job is to infiltrate, recon, sabotage, and assassinate, all behind the enemy lines. RAW would disavow him if he gets caught. He is assisted by his former trainers Nadia Qureshi, who oversees the operations, and Shaam, her trusted aid and technical lead. 

After the inauguration and reaching home, Arjun realizes he misinterpreted the clue (the code is reverse—The code is 12 November, not 11 December), and that fateful day is the graduation day and that Acharya himself is the target. Arjun tries to warn Basha, but the convoy gets attacked where Basha and Acharya are killed while the assailants flee. At the same time in the Trinetra office, Damodar sips the Whiskey, which was presented by Arjun, and has a conversation with his friend Sathya, who is an ex-RAW agent and Arjun's uncle. Suddenly, Damodar starts choking where he collapses down and dies, revealing that the whisky is poisoned. Arjun learns from the news that he has been framed as the kingpin of the attack, and PMO issues an arrest warrant against him. Simultaneously, Arjun gets attacked by the Al-Mujahideen members and Sameera dies in that attack. Arjun manages to defeat and escape from the commandos, and he leaves for Rajahmundry, to meet Sathya. They both deduce that there is a mole in Trinetra. Arjun decides to investigate Rana and the mole's identities. Based on clues, he leaves for Visakhapatnam. 

Meanwhile, Nadia and Shaam are appointed to catch Arjun. In a media primetime watch, a reporter shows that Arjun is in Rajahmundry on their channel. Shaam travels to Rajahmundry to trace Arjun. Meanwhile, through a phone call received by Nadia on Arjun's phone, she learns that he has a personal locker in a private bank. Nadia opens the locker and finds out about Arjun's past. Rana makes a plan to nab Arjun through his spy Khan. Khan sees Arjun in a market and chases him, but Arjun manages to escape from him successfully and reaches the Visakhapatnam airport to escape, but the local police are searching for him at the airport. Arjun finds Sameera's uncle and confronts him, but Sameera's uncle commits suicide by consuming cyanide. When checking the purse, Arjun finds out Sameera Rao's real identity (Sameera Sheikh). She is a psychology graduate at Harvard who belongs to Chittagong, Bangladesh. With the help of Sathya, he understands that Sameera was also a member of Al-Mujahideen and that he was completely trapped by them. He escapes successfully from the local police and reached Chittagong via sea route and meets his colleague Leena Raajan. Leena believes Arjun is innocent and helps him to find the truth. 

Meanwhile, with a minor clue, Shaam finds out about Sathya's hideout and informs Nadia. At the same time, in Chittagong, Leena and Arjun find out about Sameera's psychology clinic. Leena asks everyone about Sameera as her friend, which is noticed by the sleeper cells. They follow Leena and attack her, but Arjun rescues her, and he infiltrates the headquarters of Al-Mujahideen with Leena's help and finds some DVDs in the hideout. Leena is attacked by Khan and is severely injured. Arjun rescues her again and kills Khan, where he destroys the Al-Mujahideen's headquarters. Arjun finds the training videos of the terrorists and propaganda in a secret locker at the camp. In a video shop, he watches all the old CDs which he has found in the hideout. All the CDs mentioned about Al-Mujahideen show how they brainwashed people into becoming terrorists in the training, and it reveals Al-Mujahideen chief Rana's face. Arjun is shocked and calls Sathya and asks about Raghuveer. Satya reveals that Rana is none other than Raghuveer, who is Sathya's former friend, ex-Trinetra agent, and Arjun's father. 

20 years ago in Sikkim, Sathya had received information about a Trinetra agent, who was working as a covert to Al-Mujahideen. To find out about him, Sathya arrived with his team to catch them and noticed Raghuveer giving all the details of Trinetra agents and their offices. Satya's colleague Vijay started firing on them. In the ensuing shootout, Raghuveer and Satya remain, where Raghuveer tried to kill the wounded Satya, but he was shot from the backside by Vijay before he died. Raghuveer then jumped into the river and Sathya thought he was dead and the information which has leaked by him to the terrorists. Sathya informed to shut down the entire Trinetra agency and didn't revealed to anyone that Raghuveer is Rana as he feared that Al-Mujahideen members might try to take Arjun. To save Arjun, he resigned from RAW and started a secret life with Arjun, changed their identities, and moved to Rajahmundry, and became his father to the world. To divert Al-Mujahideen, Sathya created a fake news that they both died in a car accident. Later, Trinetra was completely shut down from that day onwards and was relaunched by the RAW in 2008. 

After hearing this, Arjun confesses that Raghuveer is alive. Rana bargers into Sathya's hideout and instructs Arjun to arrive at his secret base. Arjun reaches Rana's base. Rana reveals that he acted as an Indian spy to spy on RAW, but felt dejected after hearing about his son's death, but he learns that Arjun is alive through the RAW application form. Rana announces that he has his members in Trinetra too, and he decided to kill all the people who are responsible for hiding his son and decided to bring his son back permanently. He reveals that everything was set up by him until now. In the beginning, he uses Sameera to act as Arjun's girlfriend to get information on Gopi and Satya, but she changed her mind and started liking Arjun. According to his plan, he tried to kill Satya, Damodar and Acharya at the same time. However, Sameera managed to resist Sathya for a visit and she didn't inject anesthesia to Arjun or else he can kidnap him and killed all of them in one shot, but couldn't have been possible. Thus, Rana killed her and shifted to PLAN-B. According to that, Arjun wants to search for Raghuveer by himself and played all the tricks to find for himself.  

Later, Raghuveer points his gun at Sathya and orders Arjun to come with him. Arjun reveals that Trinetra is watching everything and the soldiers arrive to attack the Al-Mujahideen forces. After the attack, Rana escapes with Satya, followed by Arjun. After a rough chase, The wounded Rana again points his gun at Sathya to force Arjun to come with him. Arjun remembers Damodar's words and shoots Raghuveer to death. A week later, Arjun reveals that Basha confessed his conversation with Arjun to Nadia before his death. Then she tracked Arjun's phone and found Sathya's number. Sathya warns Nadia about the mole in Trinetra. Nadia had helped Arjun through Leena secretly. Finally, Arjun confesses that he found the mole in Trinetra and the culprit is going to die in a few minutes. Arjun reveals that Shaam is the culprit. He observed in the DVDs (with the kids who are brainwashed) where the boy, who is getting trained in the terrorist camp and reveals his name as Shaam. Shaam raises his gun to shoot Arjun, but Arjun reminds him that Trinetra is always watching. 

The Trinetra officers shoot Shaam to death. In Mount Alps, Arjun decided to leave Trinetra, but Nadia reminds Arjun of Acharya's words about responsibilities towards the nation and makes him confident. Nadia handovers a letter to Arjun, which she had found in Arjun's bank locker written by Sameera. In the letter, Sameera apologizes for not disclosing her identity and shares her feelings with him. In the mid-credits scene, Arjun alias Agent Gopi 116 is seen reporting to Nadia and continuing his mission in Russia as a Goodachari.

Cast 
 Adivi Sesh as M. Gopi / M. Arjun Kumar
 Sobhita Dhulipala as Sameera Rao / Sameera Sheikh
 Jagapathi Babu as M. Raghuveer / Rana, Gopi's Biological father, Al-Mujahideen's spy and leader
 Prakash Raj as Sathya
 Supriya Yarlagadda as Nadiya Qureshi
 Vennela Kishore as Shaam
 Anish Kuruvilla as Damodar
 Rakesh Varre as Mohammed Basha
 Madhu Shalini as Leena Rajan
 Ravi Prakash as Vijay
 Swaraj Rebbapragada as Acharya
 Preeti Singh as Uma Vishwanath
 Irfan Sia as Ravi Varma
 Ravi Myskar as Kishore Krishnamurthy
 Mayank Parakh as Abdul Qadir

Production 
In 2017, debutant director Sashi Kiran Tikka announced that he would be making a film with actor Adivi Sesh in the lead role with Sricharan Pakala as the music composer. Sesh stated that Gudachari 116 (1966) starring Krishna was the inspiration behind the film. Sesh approached Krishna for a cameo role in the film, however, Krishna turned it down but gave Sesh permission to re-use clips from his old films. Sesh plays Agent Gopi with the code number 116 as a tribute to the film Gudachari 116.

The first-look poster of the film was released on 13 January 2018 coinciding with Sankranthi festival.

Soundtrack 
The soundtrack of Goodachari consists of seven songs, all of which were composed by Sricharan Pakala.

Reception

Critical reception 
The Times of India gave the film 4/5 stars and wrote, "Goodachari proves what Tollywood can do, if only it makes different choices and dreams big. Filled with edge-of-the-seat moments and riveting twists, this one is the perfect popcorn entertainer." GreatAndhra gave it a rating of 3/5 and wrote, "'Goodachari' is a well-made spy thriller with right mix of suspense, action, and emotion." The Hindustan Times gave it 3/5 stars and wrote, "However, away from these obvious set-ups and spoon-fed moments, there is magic in this film." The Hindu wrote, "This coming-of-age story of a spy is a winner," and praised it for its racy screenplay.

Idlebrain.com's Jeevi gave it 3.25/5 stars and wrote, "Making a spy film in Telugu and making sure that it doesn't look pretentious is an achievement. With movie lovers having access to digital platforms and with all spy films (James Bond series, Kingsman, Mission Impossible, etc. in general and Paramanu, Raazi, etc. in particular) being available at no cost, it takes a lot of guts and ability for makers to select spy genre for a regional film. There are budget constraints too. The team has delivered a genuine spy action film that is engaging and which can stand on its own without drawing any comparisons with any other Hollywood film. Goodachari is different, yet commercial. You may watch it!" The News Minute praised it for its originality and said that it didn't run out of ideas. They wrote, "Goodachari is a movie that gives its audience its money's worth, and shows how we have not used up all possible roles where a veteran like Prakash Raj can add value!"

123telugu gave it 3.5/5 stars and said, "If Adivi Sesh's Kshanam gave a new edge to the thriller genre, Goodachari is a notch higher and showcases that there are makers in Tollywood who can dream big and make films on an international level. Goodachari is filled with edge-of-the-seat moments and riveting thrills which will keep you entertained. As the film is made on a compact budget, it will make merry at the box office because of its universal appeal. If you ignore the slightly slow second half, you can happily enjoy this popcorn thriller which is filled with ample twists and turns." Indiaglitz gave it 3.25/5 stars, saying that "'Goodachari' has the right mix: underplayed heroism, saleable emotions, thrilling twists, technical finesse, clap-worthy dialogue. Besides, it has got some of the coolest performances."

Box office 
The film grossed 25 crore in its first weekend.

Home Media 
The film satellite and digital  rights are bagged by Star Maa and Amazon Prime Video.

Sequel 
In December 2018, Sesh confirmed the film's sequel titled Goodachari 2, set to be directed by debutant, Rahul Pakala, replacing Sashi Kiran Tikka. The sequel was delayed by COVID-19 pandemic and in April 2020, Sesh confirmed writing script for Goodachari 2. In June 2022, Sesh stated that script work is yet to be finished. He also confirmed that the sequel would be a continuation of the first part. The sequel, G2, was officially announced on 29 December 2022. It will be directed by Vinay Kumar Sirigineedi, the editor of Major.

References

External links 
 

2010s Telugu-language films
2018 films
2018 action thriller films
2010s spy thriller films
Indian spy thriller films
Muay Thai films
Kung fu films
Films shot in Himachal Pradesh
Films scored by Sricharan Pakala
Films shot in India
Films set in Bangladesh
Films set in Afghanistan
Films about terrorism in India
Indian action thriller films
Indian nonlinear narrative films
Indian Army in films
Indian avant-garde and experimental films
Films about the Research and Analysis Wing
Girls with guns films
2010s avant-garde and experimental films
Films set in Andhra Pradesh
Films shot in Andhra Pradesh
Films shot in Rajahmundry
Films shot in Visakhapatnam
Films set in Visakhapatnam
Films set in Rajahmundry
Films shot in Chittagong Division